William Henry Chivell (21 October 1932 – 11 September 1996) was a South African sprinter. He competed in the men's 4 × 400 metres relay at the 1952 Summer Olympics.

References

1932 births
1996 deaths
Athletes (track and field) at the 1952 Summer Olympics
South African male sprinters
Olympic athletes of South Africa
People from Cape Agulhas Local Municipality